Sathish Muthukrishnan (born 23 May 1987) is an Indian actor and comedian working in the Tamil film industry. He made a breakthrough portraying a role alongside Sivakarthikeyan in Ethir Neechal (2013). He won Edison Award for Best Comedian for his performance in Kaththi (2014), Thangamagan (2015) and Remo (2016) and Edison Award for Best Appearance for the film Tamizh Padam 2 (2018).

Personal life

Born in a middle-class family, Sathish barely attended school and worked part-time jobs alongside his studies to support his family. Interested in cinema, he joined Crazy Mohan's Troupe in 2001, at the age of 14 and performed for nearly 8 years as part of the troupe. Crazy Mohan saw potential in Sathish and took him as one of his own, educated him and supported him financially and helped him land small roles in Jerry and other small roles until 2009. He received many awards for his dramas in Crazy Mohan from Kamal Haasan  and other celebrities.

Sathish married Sindhu in December 2019 and the marriage was attended by many celebrities including Sivakarthikeyan, Vijay Sethupathi, Jiiva, Vijay Antony, Udhayanidhi Stalin, and many others. The couple have a daughter named Niharika, born 4 November 2020.

Career
Sathish worked with Crazy Mohan in his theatre troupe for eight years, honing his histrionics and acting, while also helping write dialogues for his productions and acting in their stage play "Chocolate Krishna". A. L. Vijay made him a co-dialogue writer for Poi Solla Porom (2008), before offering him an acting role in Madrasapattinam (2010), but his debut was in the movie Jerry (2006) where he played a small role named fariq where he was shown in two shots without any dialogue.

In 2013 he appeared in Senthil Kumar's Ethir Neechal portraying Peter, with a critic noting that Sivakarthikeyan and Sathish "complement each other’s comic timing". His next notable role was as an IT professional Sandy in Maan Karate (2014), written by AR Murugadoss.

He played an important role in Kaththi (2014), co-starring Vijay in the lead role.

He received Edison Award for Best Comedian for the films Kaththi (2014), Thangamagan (2015) and Remo (2016).

Sathish played the role of an antagonist in the 2018 parody film Tamizh Padam 2, which was written and directed by C. S. Amudhan.

He marks his debut as a lead actor in Naai Sekar (2022). Sathish has chosen a wise script and put up a solid performance as the story's lead.

Filmography

References

External links
  
 

Indian male film actors
Male actors in Tamil cinema
Living people
Tamil comedians
1987 births
People from Salem district